Matthew Jackson is an American former Negro league third baseman who played in the 1930s.

Jackson played for the Montgomery Grey Sox in 1932. In 26 recorded games, he posted 29 hits and 17 RBI in 105 plate appearances.

References

External links
 and Seamheads

Year of birth missing
Place of birth missing
Montgomery Grey Sox players